The 119th Brigade, originally the Welsh Bantam Brigade, was an infantry brigade formation of the British Army during World War I. Part of Lord Kitchener's 'New Armies', it served in the 40th Division on the Western Front. The brigade number was reactivated for deception purposes during World War II.

Origin
119th Brigade was a New Army or 'Kitchener's Army' formation raised during 1915. An earlier 119th Brigade had been raised in late 1914 as part of the 'Fifth New Army', but when the Fourth New Army was broken up in April 1915 to provide reserve units for the First to Third New Armies, the formations of the Fifth took their place, and the original 119th Brigade was renumbered 100th Brigade. By the time the new 119th Brigade was organised the flow of volunteers had dwindled, and the standard of height for infantry soldiers had been lowered in order to encourage recruitment. The brigade's four battalions were composed entirely of these 'bantams' recruited in Wales. The Welsh Bantam Brigade adopted the number 119 when it was assigned to 40th Division in September 1915.

Initial order of battle
The original units forming 119th Brigade were as follows:
 19th (Service) Battalion, Royal Welsh Fusiliers  – formed in March 1915 by the Welsh National Executive Committee and originally trained with 38th (Welsh) Infantry Division
 12th (Service) Battalion (3rd Gwent), South Wales Borderers – formed at Newport in March 1915 by the Welsh National Executive Committee and assigned to the Welsh Bantam Brigade
 17th (Service) Battalion (1st Glamorgan), Welsh Regiment – formed at Cardiff in December 1914 and originally assigned to 38th Division
 18th (Service) Battalion (2nd Glamorgan), Welsh Regiment – formed at Cardiff in January 1915 and originally assigned to 38th Division
 119th Brigade Machine Gun Company – joined on disembarkation in France February 1916.
 119th Trench Mortar Battery – joined on disembarkation in France February 1916.

Training
Divisional organisation and training was delayed because the other brigades contained a large proportion of under-developed and unfit men, unlike 119's 'hardy, well-knit Welshmen'. The rest of the division had to undergo a drastic weeding-out and the drafting in of new battalions before it was fit for service. This was completed in February 1916. Divisional training was then intensified and it was warned for overseas service in May 1916. Disembarkation was carried out at Le Havre between 2 and 6 June, and 40th Division concentrated in the Lillers area by 9 June ready to take its place in the line. Units went into the trenches attached to formations of I Corps for familiarisation, and then the division took over its own section of line. 18th Welch of 119th Brigade carried out 40 Division's first trench raid in July 1916.

Operations
A few months after 119th Brigade's arrival in France, a noted fighting general, Brig.-Gen. Frank Crozier, was appointed to the command (November 1916). During the bitter winter in the mud of the old Somme battlefield he trained the men, and when the Germans retreated to their Hindenburg Line in early 1917, the Welsh Bantam Brigade fought its first offensive actions, the Borderers taking 'Fifteen Ravine', the Welch taking a ridge named 'Welch Ridge' and the Royal Welch Fusiliers taking La Vacquerie and renaming it 'Fusilier Ridge'.

Bourlon Wood
Later in the year, 119th Brigade took a leading part in the capture of Bourlon Wood (23–25 November) during the Battle of Cambrai. Despite the formation's lack of experience of fighting with tanks, 40th Division's attack was the most successful on 23 November. Once inside the wood, Crozier found that both flanks were in the air, but stocked his positions with food and ammunition to hold out against fierce counter-attacks. Although 119th Brigade was relieved by the Guards Division after epic fighting, the cavalry failed to move through to continue the battle.

After the losses of 1917 the Welsh Bantam Brigade had almost disappeared and in February 1918 it was reorganised. 19th Royal Welsh Fusiliers sent a draft to one of its Regular battalions and was then disbanded, as were 12th South Wales Borderers and 17th Welsh; the remaining men of these battalions were transferred to entrenching battalions. Only 18th Welsh of the original brigade remained; this was joined by 13th East Surrey Regiment and 21st Middlesex Regiment (from 120th Brigade and 121st Brigade respectively in 40th Division). The Brigade Machine Gun Company left to join the Divisional Machine Gun Battalion.

German Spring Offensive
119th Brigade took part in the following further actions during the German spring offensive of 1918:
 Battle of St Quentin 21–23 March
 First Battle of Bapaume 24–25 March
 Battle of Estaires 9–11 April
 Battle of Hazebrouck 12–13 April.

After suffering heavy losses in these actions, 40th Division was withdrawn from the Line and temporarily formed into two Composite Brigades. No 2 Composite Brigade formed under Brig-Gen Crozier on 27 April 1918 consisted of:
 A Battalion (18th Welsh)
 B Battalion (13th East Surrey)
 C Battalion (10/11th and 14th Highland Light Infantry from 120th Brigade)
 Company of 40th Battalion, Machine Gun Corps
 136th Field Ambulance Royal Army Medical Corps
 No 2 Company, 40th Divisional Train, Army Service Corps

2 Composite Brigade was engaged in digging the Poperinghe Line in case of further German breakthroughs. It was withdrawn on 2 May, and in common with the rest of the division the units were reduced to training cadres and sent to England.

Reconstitution
In June 1918, 40th Division was reconstituted from 'Garrison Guard' battalions composed of men of Medical Category 'B1'. The division was officially revived on 14 June, when 119th Brigade (still under Crozier) had the following composition:
 No 7 Garrison Guard Battalion became 13th (Garrison) Battalion, Royal Inniskilling Fusiliers
 No 8 Garrison Guard Battalion became 13th (Garrison) Battalion, East Lancashire Regiment
 No 11 Garrison Guard Battalion became 12th (Garrison) Battalion, North Staffordshire Regiment
 119th Trench Mortar Battery, reconstituted June–July 1918

The division was sent to hold the West Hazebrouck Line, a reserve position that was being prepared in case of a further German breakthrough. 119th Brigade, together with a company of Royal Engineers and seven labour companies, was assigned the northern part of this line. By dint of 'weeding out' the least fit men and by hard training, the reconstituted formation was made ready for frontline service; the battalions officially dropped the 'Garrison' part of their titles on 13 July 1918. On 18 July, 119th Brigade was the first part of the division to re-enter the frontline, taking over a trench sector under command of 1st Australian Division until the end of the month. The brigade was back in the line in August, taking a full part in trench raids, encouraged by Crozier's offer of a £5 reward for the first German prisoner brought in, and £1 for each subsequent capture.

Advance to Victory
On 27 August the reconstituted division made its first attack, with 119th Brigade contributing 13th Inniskilling Fusiliers and a company of 12th North Staffords. For the next few weeks the brigade followed the retreating Germans towards the River Lys with fighting patrols and some small sharp actions were fought. The brigade then took a full part in the 'Final Advance' of October–November 1918 from the Lys to the Scheldt. After dark on 8 November Crozier crossed the Scheldt by pontoon bridges with 13th East Lancashires and 12th North Staffords and by the following morning 119th Brigade had occupied a line across the railway on the higher ground beyond. After this, 40th Division was withdrawn from the Front, and the war ended on 11 November with the signing of the Armistice with Germany.

Disbandment
After the Armistice, the division was engaged in road repair and refresher courses for men returning to civilian trades. Demobilisation proceeded rapidly during January and February 1919, and its units were reduced to cadre strength by March. The final cadres disappeared during May.

Commanders
The following officers commanded the Welsh Bantam Brigade/119th Brigade during World War I:
 Brigadier-General R.C. Style (from 22 July 1915)
 Brigadier-General C.S. Prichard (from 8 May 1916)
 Brigadier-General C. Cunliffe-Owen (from 16 August 1916)
 Brigadier-General F.P. Crozier (from 20 November 1916)

Second World War
119th Brigade was never reformed, but the number was used for deception purposes during the Second World War. 30th Battalion, Somerset Light Infantry, a line of communication unit serving in 43rd Brigade in Sicily and composed mainly of men below Medical Category 'A', was redesignated '119th Infantry Brigade' and acted as if it were a full brigade in an equally fictitious '40th Infantry Division' from November 1943 until April 1944.

Notes

References
 Maj A.F. Becke,History of the Great War: Order of Battle of Divisions, Part 3b: New Army Divisions (30–41) and 63rd (R.N.) Division, London: HM Stationery Office, 1939/Uckfield: Naval & Military Press, 2007, .
 Bryan Cooper, The Ironclads of Cambrai, London: Souvenir Press 1967/Pan 1970, .
 Brig-Gen F.P. Crozier, A Brass Hat in No Man's Land, London: Jonathan Cape, 1930/Uckfield: Naval & Military Press, 2011, .
 Brig-Gen Sir James E. Edmonds, History of the Great War: Military Operations, France and Belgium 1918, Vol V, 26th September–11th November, The Advance to Victory, London: HM Stationery Office, 1947/Imperial War Museum and Battery Press, 1993, .
 
 Lt-Col F.E. Whitton, History of the 40th Division Aldershot: Gale & Polden, 1926/Uckfield: Naval & Military Press, 2004, .

External sources
 The Long, Long Trail

Military units and formations established in 1915
Infantry brigades of the British Army
Infantry brigades of the British Army in World War I
Military units and formations disestablished in 1919
B119
Fictional units of World War II